The list of shipwrecks in 2018 includes ships sunk, foundered, grounded, or otherwise lost during 2018.

January

1 January

2 January

5 January

6 January

8 January

10 January

11 January

12 January

13 January

14 January

16 January

17 January

18 January

19 January

22 January

24 January

26 January

27 January

30 January

31 January

February

1 February

2 February

3 February

10 February

16 February

18 February

22 February

23 February

27 February

28 February

Unknown date

March

1 March

6 March

10 March

12 March

13 March

14 March

20 March

21 March

25 March

28 March

31 March

Unknown date

April

6 April

7 April

8 April

18 April

24 April

May

16 May

18 May

22 May

23 May

25 May

28 May

29 May

30 May

June

13 June

14 June

15 June

18 June

24 June

29 June

July

2 July

4 July

5 July

6 July

9 July

11 July

12 July

15 July

18 July

23 July

25 July

26 July

August

2 August

3 August

6 August

8 August

10 August

12 August

15 August

16 August

17 August

18 August

23 August

24 August

25 August

27 August

29 August

30 August

September

2 September

3 September

4 September

6 September

7 September

8 September

11 September

12 September

13 September

14 September

15 September

16 September

20 September

21 September

22 September

25 September

26 September

28 September

30 September

October

1 October

3 October

5 October

6 October

10 October

11 October

13 October

15 October

17 October

18 October

22 October

25 October

Unknown date

November

3 November

8 November

9 November

10 November

15 November

16 November

17 November

20 November

22 November

24 November

26 November

December

5 December

7 December

8 December

9 December

17 December

18 December

19 December

22 December

24 December

25 December

26 December

28 December

31 December

28 December

Notes

References

Shipwrecks
2018